The teams competing in Group 1 of the 2000 UEFA European Under-21 Championship qualifying competition were Belarus, Denmark, Italy, Switzerland and Wales.

Standings

Matches
All times are CET.

Goalscorers
TBD

External links
 Group 1 at UEFA.com

Group 1